Dixie Hills may mean:
Dixie Hills, Atlanta, a neighborhood
Dixie Hills, Nevada, a mountain range